János Haraszti, Dr. (Kaposvár, 29 October 1924 – Budapest, 22 October 2007) was a veterinarian, university teacher, and researcher. He used to be the key figure of Hungarian reproductive biology research. He became one of the first members of the Hungarian Academy of Sciences as a veterinarian. He was the Secretary of the Committee of Veterinary Medicine of the Hungarian Academy of Science and President of the Association of Hungarian Veterinarians.

References

Hungarian veterinarians
Hungarian scientists
Members of the Hungarian Academy of Sciences
1924 births
2007 deaths